Apateon is an extinct genus of temnospondyl amphibian within the family Branchiosauridae.

Species

†Apateon caducus
†Apateon dracyi
†Apateon flagrifer
†Apateon gracilis
†Apateon kontheri
†Apateon pedestris von Meyer 1840
†Apateon umbrosus

Fossil record
Fossils of Apateon  are found in freshwaters strata of Permian of Germany (age range: from 295.0 to 290.1 million years ago.).

Description
They resembled a salamander and had a laterally flattened tail with a long fin. The body was completely covered with rounded scales. The portion of the skull behind the eyes was quite short. On opposite sides of the head there are three pairs of long, spiral-shaped external gills. They had a weakly ossified skeleton and a wide, short skull, with huge eye holes. The teeth were small and peaked. On the hands are present four fingers.

Biology and lifestyle
Apateon  were sexually mature in the larval state, with the retention by adults of traits seen in the young (neoteny). This fully aquatic animals lived in semi-permanent lakes and ponds. They fed on microorganisms.

Bibliography
 Cyril Walker & David Ward (1993) - Fossielen: Sesam Natuur Handboeken, Bosch & Keuning, Baarn. 
 Gaining Ground: The Origin and Early Evolution of Tetrapods
 Hermann von Meyer, 1844: Briefliche Mittheilung an Prof. Bronn gerichtet. Neues Jahrbuch für Geognosie, Geologie und Petrefakten-Kunde 1844: 329–340.
 Hermann von Meyer, 1848: Apateon pedestris aus der Steinkohlenformation von Münsterappel. – Palaeontographica 1: 153–154.
 Jürgen Boy, 1972: Die Branchiosaurier (Amphibia) des saarpfalzischen Rotliegenden (Perm, SW-Deutschland). Abhandlungen des hessischen Landes-Amtes für Bodenforschung 65: 1–137.
 Jürgen Boy, 1987: Studien uber die Branchiosauridae (Amphibia: Temnospondyli; Ober-Karbon-Unter-Perm) 2. Systematische Übersicht. Neues Jahrbuch für Geologie und Paläontologie, Abhandlungen 174: 75-104.
 Rainer Schoch und Andrew Milner, 2014: Temnospondyli. In: Sues, H.D. (Hrg): Encyclopedia of Paleoherpetology, Band 3A2. Pfeil: München.
 Rainer Schoch, 1992: Comparative ontogeny of Early Permian branchiosaurid amphibians from Southwestern Germany. Developmental stages. Palaeontographica A 222: 43–83.
 Ralf Werneburg, 1991: Die Branchiosaurier aus dem Unterrotliegend des Döhlener Beckens bei Dresden. Veröffentlichungen des Naturhistorischen Museums Schleusingen 6: 75–99.

References

Branchiosaurids
Permian temnospondyls of Europe
Taxa named by Christian Erich Hermann von Meyer
Fossil taxa described in 1844